Pastel is the Spanish and Portuguese word for pastry, a sugary food, and is the name given to different typical dishes of various countries where those languages are spoken. In Mexico, pastel typically means cake, as with Pastel de tres leches. However, in different Latin American countries pastel can refer to very different sugary dishes, and even to non-sugary ones as well. In some places, like Brazil, a pastel can refer to both a sugary and non-sugary food, depending on the filling used.

Brazil

In Brazil, pastel (plural: pastéis) is a typical fast-food Brazilian dish consisting of half-circle or rectangle-shaped thin crust pies with assorted sweet fillings and fried in vegetable oil. The result is a crispy, brownish fried pie. Some of the sweet fillings are guava paste with Minas cheese, banana and chocolate also exist. The pastel is classified in Brazilian cuisine as a salgado (savoury snack). It is traditionally sold on the streets, in open-air marketplaces, or in fast-food shops known as pastelarias.  Popular folklore states that Brazilian Pastels originated when Japanese immigrants adapted Chinese fried Spring roll to sell as snacks at weekly street markets. A common beverage to drink with pastéis is caldo de cana, a sugarcane juice. Pastéis can also consist non-sweet fillings, such as ground meat, mozzarella, catupiry, heart of palm, codfish, cream cheese, chicken and small shrimp.

Mexico

In Mexico, pastel typically means cake, as in the dessert called Pastel de tres leches. Pastel de tres leches is also served in other Latin American countries, such as Nicaragua, Panama, Cuba, Puerto Rico, Guatemala, and Costa Rica, but the word used to describe it may or may not be "pastel". In Puerto Rico, for example, the same food as the one in Mexico is called Bizcocho de tres leches.

Portugal

A pastel in Portugal may refer to several types of desserts or hors d'œuvres. These include the pastel de bacalhau and the pastel de nata.

Non sugary foods

The word "pastel" (or, its plural "pasteles") is used in some Spanish-speaking countries to refer to a starchy, non-sugary food.

Brazil
In Brazil the pastel is also made in a non-sugary variety, as it can also be made with sweet fillings, such as guava paste with Minas cheese, or banana and chocolate. It is traditionally sold on the streets, in open-air marketplaces, or in fast-food shops known as pastelarias.  A common beverage to drink with pastéis is caldo de cana, a sugarcane juice.

Indonesia

In Indonesia, pastel refers to a pie of crust made of thin pastry filled with meat (usually chicken) mixed with vegetables (chopped carrot and beans), rice vermicelli and sometimes egg, then deep fried in vegetable oil. It is consumed as snack and commonly sold in Indonesian traditional markets. The similar Manadonese version replace thin flour pie crust with bread and filled with spicy cakalang (skipjack tuna) is called panada.

Philippines

In the Philippines, pastel may refer to any (usually chicken or meat) casserole dish baked in a pie crust. Among Muslim Filipinos, pastel is an alternative spelling of pastil, which refer to two different dishes. Pastil (also spelled patil, patel, or patir) among the Danao-speaking peoples refers to white rice and meat wrapped in a banana leaf; while pastil among the Tausug people refers to a nativized version of the empanada. In the province of Camiguin, however, it refers specifically to pastel de Camiguín, a soft, sweet filled bun.

Puerto Rico
In Puerto Rico, where the word is generally used in its plural form (pasteles), it is a dish which includes diced pork with olives, capers, raisins, chickpeas, and sweet peppers. This mixture is centered in dough made mainly of green bananas with a small portion of plantain, yautía, and potato. The dough is tinted with annatto oil. It is wrapped in plantain leaf, tied with string, boiled and later served, typically, with arroz con gandules (yellow-rice with pigeon peas). The overall effect is very similar to Mexican and Peruvian tamales. It is not a pastry.

See also

 Börek
 Calzone
 Chiburekki
 Circassians § Traditional cuisine
 Empanada
 Gözleme
 Haliva
 Kalitsounia
 Khuushuur
 Lángos
 Lörtsy
 Momo (food)
 Pasteles
 Pasty
 Plăcintă
 Puff pastry
 Puri (food)
 Qutab
 Samosa
 Simbusak
 Turnover (food)
  Hot Pocket

References

whatafood.ca
dailyhive
vancouverisawesome

External links

Brazilian cuisine
Pastries